Gretagrund (or Greta-Grund) is a shoal located a few km southeast of Ruhnu island in the Gulf of Riga, Estonia.

Protected area
Since 12 August 2010 the  water area was taken under protection as being a habitat for the following migratory birds: Black-throated loon (Gavia arctica), little gull (Larus minutus), red-throated loon (Gavia stellata), long-tailed duck (Clangula hyemalis), velvet scoter (Melanitta fusca) and razorbill (Alca torda). During a survey in 2008, Paramysis intermedia (from genus Paramysis) was found in Gretagrund as a new species in the Baltic Sea.

References

Shoals of the Baltic Sea
Ruhnu
Protected areas of Estonia
Protected areas established in 2010
2010 establishments in Estonia
Landforms of Saare County
Landforms of Estonia